The Nurmijärvi church village (also known as Nurmijärvi) is the administrative center of the municipality by the same name in Uusimaa, Finland, with about 8,000 inhabitants. At the end of 2018, the population of the Nurmijärvi's urban area in accordance with Statistics Finland's agglomeration area was 7,429, made it the second most-populated urban area of the municipality.

The connecting road 1311 (former regional road 131) runs through the center between the Rajamäki and Hämeenlinnanväylä junctions. There is also a road connection to the center of Tuusula, as regional road 139 runs through the village of Palojoki towards Hyrylä. The largest industrial and business area in the municipality, Ilvesvuori, is being built near the center by the Tampere Highway (E12), and a large logistics center owned by Kesko is being built there, among other things. Next to Ilvesvuori, along the motorway, there is Myllykukko, known as a place for refueling and eating, and its services include Hesburger and Subway restaurants, among others.

Nurmijärvi center has many service sector jobs. Its municipal services include the municipal hall, library, several grocery stores (three Kesko's and one S Group's), main health center, fire station and police station. It also has two primary schools (Maaniittu school and Lukkari School) and one high school. Other facilities include the Kino Juha cinema and bus station. The grocery chain Lidl and the discount store chain Tokmanni opened their stores in August 2022. There is also Finland's only Erätukku, a store specializing in equipments of wilderness hiking and fishing, which reopened in 2018 with the help of a new owner. In 2021, the Bowling Corner & Billiard leisure venue was opened, where people can go bowling and play billiards.

On Aleksis Kiven tie street is the Nurmijärvi church (1793) and the cemetery, the old rectory called Lukkarila, and Mäntylä, the house of Malakias Costiander, the first schoolmaster of Nurmijärvi; Costiander was known as Aleksis Kivi's teacher. Near the church was also the first pharmaceutical factory in Finland, once founded by Albin Koponen. Next to the village was once a lake of the same name, which was partially drained in the 1920s and completely in the 1950s to gain more farmland.

See also
 Rajamäki (village)
 Vihti (village)

References

Nurmijärvi
Villages in Finland